Generative may refer to:

 Generative actor, a person who instigates social change
 Generative art, art that has been created using an autonomous system that is frequently, but not necessarily, implemented using a computer
 Generative design, form finding process that can mimic nature’s evolutionary approach to design
 Generative music, music that is ever-different and changing, and that is created by a system

Mathematics and science
 Generative anthropology, a field of study based on the theory that history of human culture is a genetic or "generative" development stemming from the development of language
 Generative model, a model for randomly generating observable data in probability and statistics
 Generative programming, a type of computer programming in which some mechanism generates a computer program to allow human programmers write code at a higher abstraction level
 Generative sciences, an interdisciplinary and multidisciplinary science that explores the natural world and its complex behaviours as a generative process
 Generative systems, systems that use a few basic rules to yield patterns which can be extremely varied and unpredictable

Language
 Generative grammar, an approach to theoretical linguistics based on sets of rules that generate grammatically correct sentences
 Generative lexicon, a theory of semantics which focuses on the distributed nature of compositionality in natural language
 Generative metrics, theories of verse structure based on generative linguistic ideas
 Generative principle, the idea in foreign language teaching that humans have the capacity to generate an infinite number of phrases from a finite grammatical competence 
 Generative semantics, an approach developed from transformational generative grammar that assumes that deep structures are the sole input to semantic interpretation

See also 
 Generate (disambiguation)